The  is a 13.2 km railway line owned by Iyotetsu. The line connects Matsuyama with Tōon in Ehime Prefecture, Japan. The line runs eastwards from Matsuyama City Station, terminating at Yokogawara Station.

Operations
The line is electrified with overhead lines and is single-tracked for the entire line.

The majority of rail services continue past Matsuyama City Station on the Takahama Line to Takahama Station. Trains arrive roughly every fifteen minutes.

Stations
All stations are located in Ehime Prefecture.

References

Iyotetsu Yokogawara Line
Railway lines in Japan
Rail transport in Ehime Prefecture
Railway lines opened in 1893